"Stay" was the first single from the Dutch pop punk band Destine from their second studio album Illuminate. The song was released on June 19, 2011 and received significant airplay. It was their second single to climb onto the Netherlands Top 40 charts.

A music video directed by the bands keyboard player Laurens Troost & Sitcom Soldiers was released on June 24, 2011.

On August 10 the band released an instrumental version of "Stay" for free download at MediaFire. It was released for fans to record their version of the song and post videos of them singing it YouTube wherein winners would be chosen to perform with Destine live on their October headline tour in central Europe. The winners were announced on September 1 but the link nor download was never shut down.

Track listing

iTunes single

Chart positions

References

2011 singles
2011 songs